The 1985 Pepsi 250 was an endurance race for Group A touring cars held at the Oran Park Raceway in Sydney, New South Wales on 18 August 1985. The race was the second round of the 1985 Australian Endurance Championship.

The field was divided into three classes according to engine displacement. 
Class A : 3001cc to 6000cc
Class B : 2001cc to 3000cc
Class C : Up to 2000cc

The JPS Team BMW's golden season continued as Jim Richards drove his BMW 635 CSi to a second straight AEC win after winning the opening round at Amaroo Park. Unlike the 1985 Australian Touring Car Championship and at Amaroo though, Richards did not have it all his own way. The 1 August homologation had seen the Ford Mustang back into winning contention and it was only a broken stub axle on lap 88 that resulted in the car losing a wheel which saw pole sitter and runaway leader Dick Johnson give up his stranglehold on the race (sturdier axle stubs had been homologated for the Mustang and the Palmer Tube Mills team had the new items, but did not have time pre-race to fit them to the car). Richards won the race by a lap from Peter Brock in his Mobil Holden Dealer Team VK Commodore with the Volvo 240T of Robbie Francevic finishing third. Francevic's 3rd place also saw him win Class B.

Dick Johnson showed the benefit of the homologation gain, putting his Mustang on pole with a time of 1:15.1, some 1.2 seconds faster than his pole time at the circuit for the final round of the ATCC just over a month earlier.

Results

* The event had 33 starters

Notes
 Pole Position: #17 Dick Johnson, Ford Mustang - 1:15.1
 Fastest Lap: N/A
 Race Time: 2:12:07.2

References

Australian Motor Racing Year, 1985/86
James Hardie 1000, 1985/86
The Australian Racing History of Ford, 1989
The Official Racing History of Holden, 1988

Pepsi 250